Yat (Ѣ, ѣ) is a letter in the Early Cyrillic alphabet.

Yat. or YAT, may also refer to:

People
 Chao Yat (born 1968), Hong Kong comics artist
 Moy Yat (1938–2001), Chinese artist
 Yun Yat (1934–1997), Kampuchean politician
 Yat Hwaidi, Khmer politician
 Yat Malmgren (1916–2002), Swedish dancer and acting teacher
 Ponhea Yat (1394–1463), last king of the Khmer Empire
 Yat Ahk I, third king of Mayan city-state Piedras Negras in Guatemala

Places
 Symonds Yat, a village on the River Wye in Herefordshire, UK

Transport
 YAT, the IATA code for Attawapiskat Airport in Ontario, Canada
 YAT, the MTR code for Yau Tong station in Hong Kong, China
 YAT, the National Rail code for Yatton railway station in North Somerset, UK

Other uses
 Yat, a dialect of New Orleans English
 Sodam Yat, a DC Comics superhero
 YAT Anshin! Uchū Ryokō, an anime series
 yat, ISO 639-3 code of the Yambeta language of Cameroon
 yat, a substituted form of þat, which is a Middle English spelling of that
 Anti-Terror Units (Kurdish: Yekîneyên Antî Teror, short: YAT), special forces of the Syrian Democratic Forces composed of members from the People's Defense Units (YPG) and Women's Protection Units (YPJ)

See also